ASB or asb may refer to:

 Ashgabat Airport, IATA code ASB
 Antisocial behavior
 Anti-social Behaviour Act 2003, an act of parliament in the United Kingdom, called the ASB law
 Asymbescaline, a psychedelic drug similar to Mescaline
 American Saddlebred, horse breed
 Apostilb, a unit of luminance
 Alt.sex.bondage, a Usenet newsgroup
 Alien space bats, a term used while discussing implausible points of divergence in alternate history
 Asociación de Scouts de Bolivia
 Advanced stop box, an area at an intersection reserved for certain types of vehicles.
 Arbeiter-Samariter-Bund Deutschland, a German charity

Education
 Aarhus School of Business, a Danish business school
Adventist School Bouchrieh, a Lebanese-American school
 Alternative Spring Break, an elongated phrase for Alternative break  
 Ancell School of Business, the business school at Western Connecticut State University in Danbury, Connecticut
 The Alabama School for the Blind, part of the Alabama Institute for Deaf and Blind
 American School of Barcelona, a private tri-lingual school (pre-K to 12th Grade) in Barcelona, Spain
 Asia School of Business, a business school cofounded by Bank Negara Malaysia and MIT Sloan School of Management, and located in Kuala Lumpur, Malaysia
 Associated Student Body, a type of student organization
 The Australian School of Business, a business school at the University of New South Wales, Sydney, Australia

Business
 Accounting Standards Board, responsible for issuing accounting standards in United Kingdom
 ASB Bank, one of the largest banks in New Zealand
 Auditing Standards Board, a technical committee related to accounting in the United States
 American Savings Bank, Hawaii's third-largest financial institution

Writing
 A. S. Byatt (born 1936), English critic, novelist, poet and short story writer
 Archives of Sexual Behavior, a sexology journal
 Alternative Service Book, a prayer book of the Church of England